Domashny is a Russian TV network which targets female viewers aged 25–60. It was launched in March 2005. Domashny was aimed to deliver programming to capture an attractive audience in demand by advertisers, but traditionally under-served by broadcasters.

CTC Media created the Domashny brand in 2005 from the ground up. Today, Domashny has a potential audience of 63 million people. In 2006, Domashny's average audience share in its target demographic was 2.4%, compared to 1.7% in 2007.

Domashny Network in 2008 comprised four owned-and-operated stations. Today it has more than 230 affiliates, including 13 owned-and-operated stations.

Russian series
The programming of Domashny focuses on issues of interest to women including health, family, career, style and fashion. The most popular shows on Domashny include the legal show focusing on family issues, family cases, and a show centered on medical malpractice.

Classic movies
Domashny broadcasts only the classic movies from the platinum collection of Hollywood. All the movies on Domashny are aimed at family audience.

Foreign series
Domashny offers its audience the best in medical dramas: the Emmy winning series ER and House M.D. For the younger viewers, it offers the comedy sitcom ALF. Desperate Housewives, Bewitched, Latin American telenovelas shown on Domashny are extremely successful with its target audience.
 Cashmere Mafia
 Cougar Town
 Desperate Housewives
 Dirty Sexy Money
 ER
 The Good Wife
 House M.D.
 Lipstick Jungle
 Muhteşem Yüzyıl
 Murder, She Wrote
 Royal Pains
 Scrubs

External links

CTC Media Official website

Russian-language television stations in Russia
Television channels and stations established in 2005
2005 establishments in Russia